Gutfreund is a surname of German origin. Notable people with the surname include:

Amir Gutfreund (1963-2015), Israeli writer
Hanoch Gutfreund, Israeli Andre Aisenstadt Chair in theoretical physics, and former President, of the Hebrew University of Jerusalem
Herbert Gutfreund (1921–2021), British biochemist
John Gutfreund (1929–2016), American businessman
Otto Gutfreund (1889–1927), Czech sculptor
Yossef Gutfreund (1932–1972), Israeli wrestling coach and referee who was killed in the Munich massacre at the 1972 Olympic Games
Andre R. Guttfreund (born 1946), Salvadoran film director and producer

See also
Goodfriend

German-language surnames
Jewish surnames
Yiddish-language surnames